Andrew Ian Jacobs (born 26 November 1952) is a British sports radio personality who presents the Hawksbee and Jacobs show alongside Paul Hawksbee and on talkSPORT in the UK, on Mondays, Wednesdays and Fridays live from 13:00-16:00. He also writes and presents 'The Birthday Spread' feature on Thursdays at 15:30.

They have been presenters on talkSPORT since the station's inception in 2000; having worked for the station when it was known as Talk Radio in 1999.

Jacobs was the founding editor of FHM magazine, and the head of development at Avalon Television, producing series Fantasy Football League for BBC2, and Fantasy World Cup for ITV.

Personal life
Jacobs is a fan of Chelsea FC. and Brentford FC. He is also a keen cricket fan and is known to self combust live on air when England have a batting collapse as he tries to broadcast.

References

External links

British radio presenters
1952 births
Living people
English Jews